John Tryll (fl. 1386) was an English politician.

He was a Member (MP) of the Parliament of England for Tavistock in 1386. Nothing more is known of him.

References

Year of birth missing
Year of death missing
English MPs 1386
Members of the Parliament of England for Tavistock